Teri Peterson (born November 6, 1959 in Santa Monica, California) is an American model and actress. She was Playboy magazine's Playmate of the Month for its July 1980 issue.

See also
 List of people in Playboy 1980–1989

References

External links
 
 

1959 births
Living people
1980s Playboy Playmates
Actresses from Santa Monica, California
21st-century American women